is a Japanese company specialising in the field of wireless electronics for the communications industry.

History 
Established in 1915, the company has produced a wide variety of products including marine electronics, measuring equipment for telecommunication, radio broadcasting equipment, and amateur radio equipment, including the JST-145dx/JST-245dx HF transceivers, which were the last amateur radio transceivers produced by JRC, ending in 2002.

References

External links 

JRC global site 
JRC website

Electronics companies of Japan
Defense companies of Japan
Avionics companies
Marine electronics
Navigation system companies
Electronics companies established in 1915
Japanese companies established in 1915
Companies listed on the Tokyo Stock Exchange
Companies based in Tokyo
Amateur radio companies
Public safety communications
Global Positioning System
Japanese brands
Mobile phone manufacturers